Maple Leaf Wrestling was the unofficial name in the 1970s and 1980s of the professional wrestling promotion run by Frank Tunney in Toronto, Ontario, Canada.

History

Queensbury Athletic Club

The promotion, initially known as the Queensbury Athletic Club, traces its roots back to 1930, when it was launched by Jack Corcoran, who had previously promoted boxing in Toronto under the Queensbury name. Initially, Corcoran was involved in a promotional war with rival promoter Ivan Mickailoff, but after Corcoran allied himself with the new Maple Leaf Gardens in 1931, he took control of professional wrestling in Toronto. The Gardens would remain the main venue for the promotion for more than 60 years.

The Tunneys take over

Corcoran stepped down in 1939 and was bought out by his assistants, John and Frank Tunney. John died just a few months later, and the promotion was then run by Frank. Through most of the 1940s and 1950s, Frank Tunney's biggest star was local hero Whipper Billy Watson, who became a two-time world champion. Starting in 1969, the shows were headlined by The Sheik for more than eight years. Over the decades, they kept the Gardens busy on nights when there was no hockey game. Canadian, British Empire and world titles were all fought there.

Aligning with Jim Crockett Promotions
In 1978, Tunney began working with promoter Jim Crockett, Jr., who ran Mid-Atlantic Championship Wrestling in the Carolinas. The two would become partners in the Toronto promotion, along with George Scott, a key executive with Crockett who had been a preliminary wrestler for Tunney from 1950-1956.

Aligning with the World Wrestling Federation
Following Frank's death in 1983, the business was run by John's son Jack Tunney and Frank's son, Eddie Tunney. The Tunneys hosted National Wrestling Alliance and Mid-Atlantic Wrestling matches until 1984, when Jack Tunney abandoned Crockett and signed with Vince McMahon's expanding World Wrestling Federation, with Jack serving as a figurehead on-air president of the WWF from 1984–1995, while also serving as the (legitimate) president of Titan Sports Canada, the local arm of the WWF's parent company.

Continued usage of the Maple Leaf Wrestling name
Following the WWF takeover in 1984, the name Maple Leaf Wrestling continued to be used for the federation's Canadian TV program (a staple of Hamilton station CHCH-TV for many years), which the WWF took over production of after the Tunneys split from the NWA. The show was hosted by Angelo Mosca and Jack Reynolds. TV tapings for the show were held in Brantford and other cities in southern Ontario for the next two years, until the WWF ceased the tapings in 1986 and decided to simply use the Maple Leaf Wrestling name for the Canadian airings of WWF Superstars of Wrestling. In these Canadian episodes there was some Canadian footage, usually matches from Maple Leaf Gardens and updates by on-air announcer and former wrestler Billy Red Lyons. These tapings were actually the precursor to the WWF's Wrestling Challenge, which became the "B" show to WWF Superstars Of Wrestling, the "A" show. Gorilla Monsoon and Jesse Ventura were the hosts for the Canadian tapings (with Ventura doing his famous "The Body Shop" segment), and when those tapings morphed into Challenge in 1986, Ventura was moved to the "A" show, Superstars, which had been renamed from WWF Championship Wrestling, and joined their announcers, Vince McMahon and Bruno Sammartino, to form a three-man team. Sammartino eventually left that team, making it just McMahon and Ventura. Bobby Heenan replaced Ventura as the Canadian tapings became WWF Wrestling Challenge.

The end of the Tunneys' involvement
In 1995, McMahon chose to run the shows in Toronto without any involvement from the Tunneys. The final show at the Gardens was held on September 17, 1995.

Some featured performers
Whipper Billy Watson
The Sheik
Ric Flair
Gene Kiniski
Dara Singh
Fritz Von Erich
Bruno Sammartino
Angelo Mosca
Dewey Robertson
Sweet Daddy Siki
Tiger Jeet Singh
Johnny Valentine
Terrible Ted, a black bear
Lord Athol Layton
Haystack Calhoun
Andre The Giant

Championships

See also

Professional wrestling in Canada

External links
Toronto Wrestling History
Maple Leaf Wrestling - Pictorial & History
Wrestling-Titles.com: Maple Leaf Wrestling
Maple Leaf Wrestling retrospective

Professional wrestling in Toronto
Canadian professional wrestling promotions
Entertainment companies established in 1930
1986 disestablishments in Ontario
National Wrestling Alliance members
1930 establishments in Ontario
Entertainment companies disestablished in 1986
WWE in Canada